Kõue is a village in Kose Parish, Harju County in northern Estonia.

Explorer Otto von Kotzebue (1788–1846) spent his last years in Kõue Manor (Triigi) which he bought in 1832.

Estonian mountaineer and photographer Jaan Künnap was also born and raised in Kõue.

References

External links
Kõue Manor
Kõue Manor at Estonian Manors Portal

Villages in Harju County